Chez Panisse is a Berkeley, California, restaurant, known as one of the originators of the style of cooking known as California cuisine, and the farm-to-table movement. The restaurant emphasizes ingredients rather than technique and has developed a supply network of direct relationships with local farmers, ranchers and dairies.

The main, downstairs restaurant serves a set menu that changes daily and reflects the season's produce. Prices vary with the day of the week, and as of 2020 range from $75 to $125. An upstairs cafe offers an a la carte menu at lower prices.

History 

The restaurateur, author and food activist Alice Waters opened Chez Panisse in 1971 with the film producer Paul Aratow, then a professor of comparative literature at the University of California, Berkeley. It is named for a character in a trilogy of Marcel Pagnol films. They set up the restaurant and its menu on the principle that it was of primary importance to use food that was fresh and in season, grown locally, organically and sustainably. They deemphasized low prices and making available a variety of products unrelated to the season of the year, which is incompatible with growing food locally.  Because the ingredients were procured locally in California, the food to some degree took on a very Californian character, hence helping create California cuisine.

Victoria Wise was the first chef. Due to Waters' insistence on using the highest-quality ingredients available regardless of cost, coupled with her lack of experience in the restaurant business, Chez Panisse struggled financially for many years. The restaurant also gained a reputation for its staff's partying and illegal drug use. Nonetheless, Waters and the restaurant began building up their network of local producers, which continues to provide the restaurant with the majority of its ingredients today. The restaurant continues to procure its ingredients from a network of local farmers, ranchers and dairies. This approach was extremely innovative. Later chefs de cuisine were Jeremiah Tower and Paul Bertolli and Jean-Pierre Moulle. The building was remodeled twice following fires in 1982 and 2013.

Influences 

The culinary influences for Chez Panisse were largely French, inspired by the 1920s cookbook of French cuisine bourgeoise, La bonne cuisine de Madame E. Saint-Ange. This book has been translated into English by Paul Aratow, who was also the first chef de cuisine at Chez Panisse. Waters, who had been an exchange student in France in the early 1960s, was influenced by French food-related values and customs, including buying local produce and frugality in avoiding waste. Other influences included vineyard owners Lulu and Lucien Peyraud and the writings of Richard Olney and Elizabeth David.

Critical reception 
In 2001, Gourmet magazine named Chez Panisse the Best Restaurant in America. From 2002 to 2008 it was ranked by Restaurant magazine as one of the top 50 restaurants in the world and was ranked number 12 in 2003. Michelin awarded the restaurant a one-star rating in its guide to San Francisco Bay Area dining from 2006 through 2009, but the restaurant lost its star in 2010. In 2007, Alice Waters won Restaurant Magazine's Lifetime Achievement Award, and was cited as one of the most influential figures in American cooking over the past 50 years.

A 2019 review by San Francisco Chronice food critic Soleil Ho praised the fruit bowl, but complained that the servers couldn't answer questions about the food and that some dishes were "acid" or "acrid." She compared the recent evolution of the restaurant to the way that "revolutionary movements fizzle out."

Culinary innovations 
 The aforementioned emphasis on farm-to-table and California cuisine.
 California-style pizza, baked in an in-house pizza oven and topped with a variety of local ingredients, was created at the cafe in 1980.
 Goat Cheese Salad: first offered in the late 1970s, the salad contains rounds of chèvre marinated in olive oil and herbs, coated in bread crumbs, and baked, served with lightly dressed mesclun.
 In-house carbonated tap water: this filtered version of the East Bay Municipal Utility District offering first replaced conventional bottled water at the restaurant in summer 2006.

Art of Chez Panisse 
Berkeley designer and printmaker David Lance Goines has illustrated many of the Chez Panisse posters and defined the visual brand in the 1970s and 1980s. The aesthetic for the brand was influenced by Ukiyo-e and the German Art Nouveau movement (German: Jugendstil).

Patricia Curtan has been the designer and artist of many of the menus and some of the cookbooks for Chez Panisse, which were created as linocut prints. Curtan published the book Menus for Chez Panisse (2011).

Notable alumni

See also
Greens Restaurant
Moosewood Restaurant

References

External links 

 
 The Green Gourmets: The Evolution of Chez Panisse
 Guide to the Chez Panisse Records, The Bancroft Library

Buildings and structures in Berkeley, California
Companies based in Berkeley, California
Restaurants in Berkeley, California
Restaurants established in 1971
Cuisine of the San Francisco Bay Area
Culture of Berkeley, California
1971 establishments in California
James Beard Foundation Award winners